Zoi Paraskevopoulou is a Greek archer who participated at the 2010 Summer Youth Olympics in Singapore. She was eliminated in the first round in the individual event. She paired up with Gregor Rajh of Slovenia to win silver in the mixed team event, losing to Gloria Filippi and Anton Karoukin in the gold medal match.

References

Archers at the 2010 Summer Youth Olympics
Living people
Year of birth missing (living people)
Greek female archers
21st-century Greek women